Lyudmyla Kichenok and Nadiia Kichenok were the defending champions, but chose to participate in Auckland instead.
Vania King and Monica Niculescu won the title, defeating Xu Yifan and Zheng Saisai in the final, 6–1, 6–4.

Seeds
The top seed received a bye into the second round.

Draw

References

WTA Shenzhen Open
2016 Doubles